Ola Enstad (10 November 1942 – 2 August 2013) was a Norwegian sculptor.

Biography
He was born in Lesjaskog in Oppland, Norway. Enstad first studied architecture at the Norwegian Institute of Technology in Trondheim. Enstad attended  the Norwegian National Academy of Craft and Art Industry Statens håndverks- og kunstindustriskole) from 1967 to 1969 and the Norwegian National Academy of Fine Arts (Statens kunstakademi) under Per Palle Storm  in 1969–1972. He debuted at the Autumn Exhibition (Høstutstillingen) in Oslo during 1970 and held a separate exhibition in the Artists' Association in 1973. He was awarded the Statens reisestipend in 1976  and Oslo bys stipend in 1977.

Among his works are Stegosaurus from 1979 (later destroyed), 4 vogger from 1989, located at the Norwegian Museum of Contemporary Art, and Neve og rose from 1991 at Lilletorget, Oslo. Ola Enstad received the Ingeborg og Per Palle Storms ærespris  in 1999.

References

1942 births
2013 deaths
People from Lesja
Norwegian Institute of Technology alumni
Oslo National Academy of the Arts alumni
Norwegian sculptors